Clark S. Haas, Jr. (July 21, 1919 – January 18, 1978)  was a cartoonist and, from 1957 to 1965, owner of Cambria Studios, which produced the limited animation series Clutch Cargo (1959).

Career

Before working professionally in cartoons, Haas was a pioneer jet pilot, according to Cambria Studios voice-actress, Margaret Kerry. His cartooning career started with work on the Sunday editions of the comic strips Buz Sawyer and Tim Tyler's Luck. From 1949 to 1951, he had his own comic strip, Sunnyside, which was distributed by Wheeler-Nicholson, Inc.

After starting Cambria Studios, he helped create and write Cambria's animated television series, Clutch Cargo (1959–1960), Space Angel (1962), Captain Fathom (1965), and The New Three Stooges (1965–1966). The first three of these series used the Syncro-Vox technique of animation developed by his Cambria partner, Edwin Gillette, in the early 1950s for producing animation quickly and at a minimal cost.

In later years Haas became associated with Hanna-Barbera and worked on their series The ABC Saturday Superstar Movie (1972), Super Friends (1973), and Speed Buggy (1973).

Notes

References
Alberto's Page of American Animators active until 1970 - Letter H

Clutch Cargo at toonopedia.com
THE CLUTCH CARGO STORY
 "Don't believe your eyes! How 'Clutch Cargo' cuts corners as a television comic strip." TV Guide December 24, 1960, p. 28-29.
 Terrace, Vincent. Encyclopedia of Television Series, Pilots and Specials, 1937-1973. New York, New York Zoetrope. 1986.

External links
Lambiek Comiclopedia article.
Toon Tracker's Clutch Cargo Page

American animators
American animated film producers
American television producers
American comics artists
Hanna-Barbera people
1919 births
1978 deaths